The 2019 was AFC U-20 Futsal Championship the biennial international the championships organised  Asian Football Confederation (AFC) for men's youth national futsal teams off Asia.

The tournament was hosted by Iran between 14 and 22 June 2019. A total the of 12 teams participated of tournament. were the defending champion but failed to defend the title after losing to Japanese in the semi-final. Japanese became the champions after beating Afghanistan in the final.

Qualification

Unlike the previous tournament where all teams entered the final tournament, qualifiers were held from 1 to 10 December 2018. The draw for the qualifiers was held on 30 August 2018.

Qualified teams
The following 12 teams qualified for the final tournament.

Venue
The matches were played at the Shahid Poursharifi Arena in Tabriz.

Draw
The final draw was held on 11 April 2019, 15:30 MYT (UTC+8), at the AFC House in Kuala Lumpur. The 12 teams were drawn into four groups of three teams. The teams were seeded according to their performance in the 2017 AFC U-20 Futsal Championship final tournament, with the hosts automatically seeded and assigned to Position A1 in the draw.

Squads

Players born after 1 January 1999 were eligible to compete in the tournament. Each team must register a squad of 14 players, minimum two of whom must be goalkeepers (Regulations Articles 27.1 and 27.2).

Group stage
The top two teams of each group advanced to the quarter-finals.

Tiebreakers
Teams were ranked according to points (3 points for a win, 1 point for a draw, 0 points for a loss), and if tied on points, the following tiebreaking criteria were applied, in the order given, to determine the rankings (Regulations Article 11.5):
Points in head-to-head matches among tied teams;
Goal difference in head-to-head matches among tied teams;
Goals scored in head-to-head matches among tied teams;
If more than two teams are tied, and after applying all head-to-head criteria above, a subset of teams are still tied, all head-to-head criteria above are reapplied exclusively to this subset of teams;
Goal difference in all group matches;
Goals scored in all group matches;
Penalty shoot-out if only two teams are tied and they met in the last round of the group;
Disciplinary points (yellow card = 1 point, red card as a result of two yellow cards = 3 points, direct red card = 3 points, yellow card followed by direct red card = 4 points);
Drawing of lots.

All times are local, IRDT (UTC+4:30).

Group A

Group B

Group C

Group D

Knockout stage
In the knockout stage, extra time and penalty shoot-out were used to decide the winner if necessary, except for the third place match where penalty shoot-out (no extra time) was used to decide the winner if necessary (Regulations Articles 15.1 and 16.1).

Bracket

Quarter-finals

Semi-finals

Third place match

Final

Winners

Awards
The following awards were given at the conclusion of the tournament:

Goalscorers

References

External links

, the-AFC.com
AFC U20 Futsal Championship 2019, stats.the-AFC.com

U-20 Futsal Championship
2019
2019 in youth association football
June 2019 sports events in Iran
International futsal competitions hosted by Iran